The Yiwen Leiju is a Chinese leishu encyclopedia completed by Ouyang Xun in 624 under the Tang. Its other contributors included Linghu Defen and Chen Shuda.

It is divided into 47 sections and many subsections. It covers a vast number of subjects and contains many quotations from older works, which are well cited. Many of these older works are otherwise long lost, so this is one of the sources used by Ming and Qing scholars to reconstruct the lost Record of the Seasons of Jingchu.

References

External links
Ricci Library Catalog
Yiwen Leiju "Collection of Various Matters from Classics and other Literature" — Chinaknowledge.de.

Chinese encyclopedias
7th-century Chinese books
Tang dynasty literature
620s

Leishu